Zio Ziegler (born 1988) is an American artist known best for his paintings and murals, many of which appear in the Mission District of San Francisco, as well as around the world such as Tokyo, Los Angeles, London, Italy, and more. His paintings have been featured both in the United States and internationally.

Early life and education

Ziegler was born February 18, 1988,.  He studied art at Brown University and the Rhode Island School of Design, and graduated with a BFA in painting from RISD in 2010.

Career

Ziegler is known for both painting and murals, stating that his paintings are mainly inspired by Literature, French Modernism, and Architecture. His art features "repeated motifs of primitive patterns, gigantism, and distortion" and is improvisational rather than carefully planned.

Murals of Ziegler can be seen on buildings around the world such as Tokyo, Los Angeles, London, Italy, and more. His mural on the factory doors of Italian bicycle manufacturer Cinelli was featured as part of an article on Design Boom.

Ziegler's paintings have been featured at exhibits internationally. Most recently in 2015, he exhibited with French artist Pierre Roy-Camille, shortly after returning from traveling around the world for various exhibitions. In 2015 he also exhibited at an Istanbul Contemporary Art Museum event, being represented in the solo artist section.

In addition to his murals and paintings, Ziegler has designed a line of Vans sneakers, and has painted art cars for collectors. He also founded the Arte Sempre clothing company in Mill Valley, the Weekend swap company and web site for coordinating the use of outdoors equipment, and another tech startup.

Solo exhibitions

 2018, The Fourth Wall, Marin Museum of Contemporary Art, Novato
2017, Meta Species, Ochi Gallery, Sun Valley, ID
2016, Bernard Gwilliam & the Quantum Modernism, Jules Maeght, San Francisco
2016, To Arrive at the Truth, Ochi Gallery, Sun Valley, ID 
2015, The Psyche's Gestures, Soze Gallery, Hollywood
 2015, Painting is the Pattern, Jules Maeght, San Francisco
 2015, The Creative Dialect, A.R.4.T Gallery, Laguna Beach
 2014, Intuitivism, Le QuiVive, Oakland
 2014, Et In Arte Ego, Antonio Colombo Arte Contemporanea, Milan, Italy
 2013, Chasing Singularity A.R.4.T Gallery, Laguna Beach
 2013, The Infinite, Gallery 81435, Telluride, CO
 2013, Chaos/ Clarity, Ian Ross Gallery, San Francisco
 2012, Lost Illusions, Project Gallery, Hollywood

References

Further reading

External links

1988 births
Living people
American muralists
Rhode Island School of Design alumni
Brown University alumni
People from Mill Valley, California
Artists from San Francisco